Abraham Skorka (born July 5, 1950, in Buenos Aires) is an Argentine biophysicist, rabbi and book author. Abraham Skorka is rector emeritus of the Seminario Rabínico Latinoamericano in Buenos Aires, the rabbi of the Jewish community Benei Tikva, professor of biblical and rabbinic literature at the Seminario Rabínico Latinoamericano and honorary professor of Hebrew Law at the Universidad del Salvador, Buenos Aires.

Career
Abraham Skorka held with the Archbishop of Buenos Aires Jorge Mario Bergoglio, later Pope Francis, a series of inter-religious talks on topics such as God, fundamentalism, atheists, death, holocaust, homosexuality, and capitalism. The dialogues alternately took place at the seat of the bishop and at the Jewish Community Benei Tikva. They were published in a book titled Sobre el Cielo y la Tierra (On Heaven and Earth).

In 1973 he graduated from the Seminario Rabínico Latinoamericano with ordination as a rabbi.

In 1979 he was awarded his doctorate in Chemistry at the University of Buenos Aires. Skorka has published scientific papers in the field of biophysics and numerous articles in the field of Biblical and Talmudic research.

He received a doctorate honoris causa from the Jewish Theological Seminary of America in New York City.

In 2010 the Universidad Católica Argentina awarded him a doctorate honoris causa, the first time in Latin America that a Catholic university gave this title to a rabbi.

In May 2017, Skorka published an approbation in regards to the Orthodox Rabbinic Statement on Christianity entitled To Do the Will of Our Father in Heaven: Toward a Partnership between Jews and Christians which was published two years beforehand by the Israel-based Center for Jewish–Christian Understanding and Cooperation (CJCUC).

In 2018-2019, he serves as Visiting University Professor at the Institute for Jewish-Catholic Relations at Saint Joseph's University in Philadelphia, Pennsylvania.

Works 
Books
 Miles de años por semana : vision actual de la lectura de la Torah. 1997
 co-author and editor: Introducción al Derecho Hebreo. 2001, 
 Hacia un mañana sin fe? 2007, Ediciones Asamblea Rabinica Latinoameriana, 
 Jorge Mario Bergoglio, Abraham Skorka: Sobre el Cielo y la Tierra. Editorial Sudamericana, Buenos Aires 2010, . Translated into English as On Heaven and Earth.
 He wrote the foreword to the 2020 book, Jesus Wasn't Killed by the Jews, Orbis Books.

Cassette
 "Maimonides' Laws of Giving to the Poor", Rabbi Abraham Skorka, Rabbinical Assembly, 2000
Articles published in La Nacion (selection)
 De la muerte de Dios a la muerte de lo humano
 Diálogo profundo en un mundo inconexo
 De Fuenteovejuna a Pasteur 633
 De la cena pascual a la eucaristía
 A cuarenta años de  Nostra Aetate
 Libertad e idolatría en el relato de la Pascua
 La visión de la Biblia sobre la paz
 A la sombra del golem
 Sacrificios que no acercan a Dios
 El diálogo interreligioso

References

External links 

Excerpts from the book Sobre el Cielo y la Tierra of Skorka and Bergoglio in Spanish: Aportes del diálogo interreligioso on Lanacion.com.ar

Videos
. (en), (The speech begins at 10.41)
, (es)
, (es)

Pictures
Entrega al Rab. Abraham Skorka del Doctorado Honoris Causa.

People from Buenos Aires
1950 births
Argentine Jews
Argentine Conservative rabbis
Biophysicists
Argentine physicists
Living people
Argentine chemists
Jewish scientists
Jewish Argentine writers
University of Buenos Aires alumni
Hebraists
Pope Francis
Jewish Theological Seminary of America alumni
Christian and Jewish interfaith dialogue
Rectors of universities in Argentina